John Taverner (1490-1545) was an English composer.

John Taverner may also refer to:

John Taverner (priest), (1584-1638)
John le Taverner, MP for Bristol in 1295, 1298 and 1306 and Mayor of Bristol
John le Taverner (1322 MP), MP for Bristol in 1322
John le Taverner (Wycombe MP), MP for Wycombe in 1338
John William Taverner, former MP in the Victorian Legislative Assembly

See also
John Tavener (disambiguation)